Doc and Merle Watson's Guitar Album is the title of a recording by American folk music artist Doc Watson and Merle Watson, first released in 1983.

It has been released on CD by Vanguard Records and Flying Fish Records.

Track listing
 "Sheeps in the Meadow/Stoney Fork" (Traditional) – 2:55
 "Talking to Casey" (Coleman) – 2:29
 "Liza/Lady Be Good" – 2:53
 "Black Pine Waltz" (Traditional) – 2:32
 "Guitar Polka" – 2:17
 "Goin' to Chicago Blues" – 4:05
 "Black Mountain Rag" (Traditional) – 2:37
 "Cotton Row" – 2:45
 "John Henry/Worried Blues" (Traditional) – 2:24
 "Twinkle, Twinkle" (Traditional) – 3:01
 "Take Me Out to the Ball Game" (Jack Norworth, Albert Von Tilzer) – 2:13
 "Gonna Lay Down My Old Guitar" (Alton Delmore, Rabon Delmore) – 2:30

Personnel
Doc Watson – guitar, harmonica, vocals
Merle Watson – guitar, slide guitar
T. Michael Coleman – bass, guitar, harmony vocals
Pat McInerney – percussion
Mark O'Connor – fiddle, mandolin
Production notes
Produced by Mitch Greenhill
Engineered by Ernie Winfrey
Mixed by Larry Forkner
Illustrations by John Zielinski and Milton Glaser
Design by Axie Breen	 and Lenora Davis

References

External links
 Doc Watson discography

1983 albums
Doc Watson albums
Flying Fish Records albums